Saint Francis of Assisi School may refer to the following schools:

Australia
 St Francis of Assisi School - Newton, South Australia
 St Francis of Assisi Primary School - Calwell, Australian Capital Territory

United States
 St. Francis of Assisi School - Yorba Linda, California - Roman Catholic Diocese of Orange
 St. Francis of Assisi School - Des Moines, Iowa - Roman Catholic Diocese of Des Moines
 St. Francis of Assisi School - Baltimore, Maryland - Baltimore Archdiocese
 St. Francis of Assisi School - Houston, Texas - Galveston-Houston Archdiocese

See also
 St Francis of Assisi Catholic College (formerly St Francis of Assisi RC School) - Wallsall, England, United Kingdom
 The Academy of St Francis of Assisi - Liverpool, England, United Kingdom
 Saint Francis of Assisi College - Philippines
 St. Francis of Assisi of Silay Foundation Inc. - Philippines